900 North Michigan in Chicago, in the U.S. state of Illinois, is a skyscraper completed in 1989. At 871 feet (265 m) tall, it is the ninth-tallest building in Chicago  and the 31st-tallest in the United States. It was developed by Urban Retail Properties in 1988 as an upscale sister to Water Tower Place, one block southeast, and was the second vertical mall built along the Magnificent Mile.

The building features a large, upscale shopping mall called 900 North Michigan Shops. Bloomingdale's occupies the rear of its wide, six-story atrium, with other luxury shops and restaurants filling the remaining spaces. For this reason, it is commonly referred to as the "Bloomingdale's Building". The mall opened with Henri Bendel as a "junior anchor". The layout of the retail area reflects lessons learned from Water Tower Place; the anchor's placement at the rear draws shoppers through the space and creates leasable space with valuable Michigan Avenue frontage, while the arrangement of escalators in parallel, rather than in zig-zags, directs foot traffic past more shops.

Offices originally occupied floors 8–28, but floors 21–28 were converted to condo units in 2007, leaving offices on floors 8–20.  The luxurious Four Seasons Hotel occupies the middle floors (30–46) of the tower. Floors 48–66 are part of the 132 East Delaware Residences, these 106 condominiums were part of the original building plan. A large 12-story parking garage, with retail on the ground level and a medical clinic atop, occupies the rear half of the block, facing Rush Street.

The exterior of the tower is clad in limestone and green glass which reflects the light. The building has a steel skeleton on which a concrete frame was erected for the upper floors. Because the building materials changed, cranes used to work on the lower floors could not be used for the concrete portion and new cranes had to be erected to complete the building. Four lit "lanterns" atop the structure give it a distinctive skyline presence. They change colors for the Christmas season.

Office tenants
Four Seasons Hotels and Resorts Worldwide Sales Office
Berkshire Hathaway
BW Capital Partners
Edgewater Funds
Grosvenor Capital Management
JHL Capital Group
JMB Financial Advisors
JMB Insurance
JMB Realty
Pircher, Nichols & Meeks
Rush Street Gaming
Walton Street Capital

Hotel and retail tenants

Retailers at the 900 Shops include:
900 North Michigan Shops
Four Seasons Hotel Chicago
Bloomingdales
Equinox Fitness
Mario Trioci
Gucci
Club Monaco
Lululemon Athletica
Kate Spade
Michael Kors
Bellina Caetano
Enchante
Bonobos
Rigby & Peller
Atlas Galleries
Azeeza US
Banana Republic
Church's English Shoes
Crosell & Co.
Kate Spade New York
Sur La Table
L'Occitane en Provence
Montblanc
MaxMara
Mini Me

Position in Chicago's skyline

See also
List of buildings
List of skyscrapers
List of tallest buildings in Chicago
List of tallest buildings in the United States
World's tallest structures

References

External links
 900 North Michigan Shops
 The Residences at 900 North Michigan Avenue
 Four Season Hotel Chicago
 Emporis listing

Office buildings in Chicago
Residential condominiums in Chicago
Residential skyscrapers in Chicago
Condo hotels in the United States
Shopping malls in Chicago
Residential buildings completed in 1989
1980s architecture in the United States
Kohn Pedersen Fox buildings
1989 establishments in Illinois
Streeterville, Chicago